Mama Drama may refer to:

 Mama Drama (album), a 1998 album by Mia X
 Mama Drama (TV series), a reality television series
 "Mama Drama" (The Cleveland Show), an episode of the TV series The Cleveland Show
 Mama Drama (film), a 2020 Nigerian film